Saqi Farooqi was an Urdu poet born on 21 December 1936 in Gorakhpur in Uttar Pradesh, India. His family migrated from India to East Pakistan and then to Karachi, Pakistan. He went from Pakistan to London and made an influence in English poetry. His famous works include Behram ki wapsi and Razoon se bhara basta.

Died 
Farooqi died on 19 January 2018 at the age of 81 in London.

References 

1936 births
2018 deaths
Urdu-language poets from Pakistan
Pakistani poets
People from Gorakhpur